ZSZ may refer to:

 Swakopmund Railway Station (IATA code), in Swakopmund, Namibia
 Zdob și Zdub, a Moldovan ska punk band